Bigaman (also Romanized as Bīgamān) is a village in Hoseynabad Rural District, Esmaili District, Anbarabad County, Kerman Province, Iran. At the 2006 census, its population was 209, in 41 families.

References 

Populated places in Anbarabad County